The 2015 Senior Women's Challenger Trophy was the sixth edition of the women's List-A tournament in India. It was played from 14 June to 17 June. It was played in a round robin format, with a final between the top two teams. India Blue beat India Red in the final by 18 runs.

Squads 

Source: BCCI

Standings

Source: CricketArchive

Group stage

Final

References

2014–15 Indian women's cricket
2015
Domestic cricket competitions in 2014–15